South African jazz is the jazz of South Africa.

History
The jazz scene in South Africa grew much as it did in the United States. Through performances in nightclubs, dances, and other venues, musicians had the opportunity to play music often. Musicians such as singer Sathima Bea Benjamin learned by going to nightclubs and jam sessions and waiting for opportunities to offer their talents. One unique aspect of the South African jazz scene was the appearance of individuals imitating popular artists as closely as possible because the real musician wasn't there to perform in the area. For instance, one could find a "Cape Town Dizzy Gillespie" who would imitate not only the music, but the look and style of Dizzy. This practice created a strong environment to nurture some artists who would eventually leave South Africa and become legitimate contributors to the international jazz scene.

One of the first major bebop groups in South Africa in the 1950s was the Jazz Epistles. This group consisted of trombonist Jonas Gwangwa, trumpeter Hugh Masekela, saxophonist Kippie Moeketsi, and pianist Abdullah Ibrahim (then known as Dollar Brand). This group brought the sounds of United States bebop, created by artists such as Dizzy Gillespie, Charlie Parker, and Thelonious Monk, to Cape Town with Moeketsi modeling his sound and style on Parker's. This group was the first in South Africa to cut a record in the bebop style, but their contemporaries, the Blue Notes, led by pianist Chris McGregor, were no less involved in the local jazz scene. Together, these two groups formed the backbone of South African bebop.

An early use of jazz as an anti-apartheid tool was the production of a musical entitled King Kong. Written as a social commentary on young black South Africans, much of the music was arranged and performed by famous South African jazz musicians, including all the members of the Jazz Epistles, minus bandleader Abdullah Ibrahim. The musical was premiered to an integrated audience at the University of Witwatersrand despite efforts of the government to prevent its opening. The university had legal jurisdiction over its property and was able to allow the gathering of an integrated audience. From this point on, as the play toured South Africa, it carried this undertone of defiance with it. The success of the play eventually took it to premiere in London, and while failing financially outside of South Africa, allowed many local jazz musicians an opportunity to obtain passports and leave the country.

In March 1960, the first in a series of small uprisings occurred, in an event that is now known as the Sharpeville Massacre. Censorship was dramatically increased by the apartheid government, which led to the shutting down of all venues and events that catered to or employed both black and white individuals. Gatherings of more than ten people were also declared illegal. As a result, a mass exodus was created of jazz musicians leaving South Africa seeking work. Among these were pianist Abdullah Ibrahim, his wife and jazz vocalist Sathima Bea Benjamin, trumpeter Hugh Masekela, and vocalist Miriam Makeba.

For some, the move proved to be fortuitous. Ibrahim and Benjamin found themselves in the company of US jazz great Duke Ellington in a night club in Paris in early 1963. The meet resulted in a recording of Ibrahim's trio, Duke Ellington presents the Dollar Brand Trio, and a recording of Benjamin, accompanied by Ellington, Billy Strayhorn, Ibrahim, and Svend Asmussen, called A Morning in Paris. Artists such as Masekela traveled to the United States and were exposed first hand to the American jazz scene.

One of the most important subgenres of jazz in the region is Cape Jazz. The music originates from Cape Town and surrounding towns and is inspired by the carnival music of the area, sometimes referred to as Goema.

Genres
Cape Jazz
Marabi

Notable South African jazz musicians

Individuals 

The following is a list of South African jazz musicians.

 Allen Kwelaguitarist
 Andile Yenanapianist
 Barney Rachabanetenor saxophonist; deceased
 Basil "Manenberg" Coetzeesaxophonist; deceased
 Bheki Mselekupiano, saxophone; deceased
 Bokani Dyerpianist
 Claude Deppatrumpet; resident in London
 Dorothy Masukasinger; born in Zimbabwe, moved to South Africa aged 12
 Dudu Pukwanacomposer, saxophonist, and pianist; deceased
 George Cupidodrums; resident in Melbourne, Australia
 Hilton Schilderpiano, multi instruments
 Ike Morizsinger, composer and lyricist
 Jabu Nkosi pianist, organist, singer, lyricist; son of Issac ‘Zacks’ Nkosi; deceased 
 Johnny Dyanicomposer and double bassist; deceased
 Johnny Fourieguitar; deceased
 Jonathan Butlerguitarist, also does rhythm and blues
 Judith Sephumasinger, now an Afro-pop singer seldom sings jazz
 Julian Bahulaband leader; resident in London
 Kesivan Naidoodrums
 Kippie Moeketsisaxophone and clarinet

 Lwanda Gogwanacomposer, trumpeter and musicologist
 Marcus Wyattcomposer, trumpeter and producer
Mark Fransman aka Sonik Citizen - composer, pianist, saxophonist, flautist, vocalist, producer
 McCoy Mrubatasaxophonist and flautist
 Melanie Scholtzsinger, songwriter
 Miriam Makeba singer songwriter, actress; deceased 
 Mongezi Fezacomposer, trumpet player and flautist
 Moreira Chonguicasaxophones
 Morris Goldberg, saxophones; resident in New York
 Moses Khumalosaxophonist; deceased
 Moses Taiwa Molelekwapianist; deceased
 Nduduzo Makhathinipianist
 Nikele Moyakesaxophonist
 Paul Hanmercomposer and pianist
 Robbie Jansenalto sax, flute, vocals; deceased
 Sibusiso Mashiloanepianist
 Sipho Gumede bass guitarist; deceased
 Tony Cedrasguitar, piano; resident in New York
 Tutu Puoanevocalist; resident in Belgium
 Winston Mankunku Ngozisaxophone; deceased
 Isaac 'Zacks' Nkosisaxophonist, clarinettist, composer, band leader; was one of the most important figures in the development of South African Jazz; deceased 
 Zim Ngqawanacomposer, flautist and saxophonist; deceased

Groups 

 African Jazz Pioneers
 National Youth Jazz Band
 The Blue Notes
 The Rhodes University Jazz Band
 UCT Big Band

References

External links
"The Development of Jazz In South Africa". Hotep Idris Galeta. November 25, 2003.

 
Music scenes